James Begg Kent (1885 – 4 November 1970) was a New Zealand politician of the Labour Party. He served as a Member of Parliament and was both a borough councillor and deputy mayor of Greymouth.

Biography

Early life and career
He was born in Dunoon, Argyll, Scotland, in 1885. There he studied as a sign writer at Dunoon Grammar School winning many awards before becoming a teacher at the same school. He then moved to London where he became the head sign writer for the London City Council works department. He became a member of the Independent Labour Party and served as a party organiser before being elected as a member of the Patrick Town Council.

Kent emigrated to New Zealand in 1909 and settled in Greymouth and established his own sign writer business. He then became secretary of the Grey Labour Paper Board which purchased the Grey River Argus in 1920 and was a director of the paper for 40 years. He then became a member of the Greymouth High School board of governors for 24 years from 1923 to 1947 and was chairman of its finance committee from 1941 to 1942.

In 1934 he married Jessie Ellen Pugh with whom he had three children. He was a member of the Westland Licensing Committee for 15 years and the Greymouth Civic Centre Board for two years. Kent was the inaugural president of the West Coast Athletic Council as well as a foundation executive member of the Greymouth Life-Saving and Surf Club, later serving 14 years as president and becoming a life member.

Political career

He became a founding member of the Social Democratic Party (SDP) and was the Greymouth branch delegate to the Grey District Workers' Council. When the SDP merged into the Labour Party Kent became president of the Westland Labour Representation Committee and later a member of the national executive of the party.

In he was a Greymouth Borough Councillor from 1925 to 1947 and served twice as deputy mayor. On the council he was the chairman of both the library and traffic committees. In 1928 he was elected as a member of the Grey Electric Power Board and was the board's chairman for four terms. By extension he became a member of the national executive  of the New Zealand Power Boards' Association.

In 1933 Kent was elected to the Grey Hospital Board and was chairman in 1942 and 1944. He was also a member of the Greymouth Harbour Board and he served as chairman between 1943 and 1946. Kent then became a member of the Greymouth Fire Board from 1944 to 1947.

In 1947 he put himself forward as a candidate for the Labour Party nomination for the Westland electorate at a by-election after the death of James O'Brien. Though he was unsuccessful with Robert James Ware ultimately being selected. Five days later however, Ware was taken ill suddenly on the same day he was due to open his campaign at a meeting in Ngahere. After receiving medical advice Ware withdrew his candidacy and Kent was selected as his replacement as the Labour candidate. He won the election and represented the West Coast electorate of Westland from 1947 to 1960, when he retired. Kent was a well read man and well versed in classical literature. Despite this he was not confident as an orator and seldom spoke for the full hour allotted to him in the house, a habit which earned him frequent heckling from National MPs.

Later life and death
He was then elected as a member of the Grey County Catchment Board from 1965 to 1968. In 1966 he became president of the West Coast Composite Coal Committee for two years.

He died in Greymouth on 4 November 1970. He was survived by his two sons and a daughter, his wife having predeceased him by three years.

Notes

References

New Zealand Labour Party MPs
1885 births
1970 deaths
People from Dunoon
People educated at Dunoon Grammar School
Independent Labour Party councillors
Councillors in Scotland
Scottish emigrants to New Zealand
Social Democratic Party (New Zealand) politicians
Members of the New Zealand House of Representatives
Deputy mayors of places in New Zealand
Local politicians in New Zealand
New Zealand MPs for South Island electorates
Members of district health boards in New Zealand